Holy Wound is a 2022 Malayalam silent film directed by Asok. R. Nath and written by Paul Wiclif. Janaki Sudheer, Amrita Vinod, Sabu Praudeen play lead roles. The film was produced by Sandeep. R for Sahasrara Cinemas. The music was by Marakkar composer Ronnie Raphael. Holy Wound explores bold themes related to lesbianism, which is unusual in Malayalam Cinema. The film was released through direct OTT on 12 August 2022.

Plot
The film depicts the story of two Homosexual young women. However, one young woman is married to a man. The young woman has no interest in sex with her husband. He brutally uses his wife for his sexual gratification. As she grieves over her husband's abuse, the young woman remembers her homosexual friend. She is now a nun.

Cast 

 Janaki Sudheer
 Amrita Vinod as Nun
 Sabu Praudeen as Husband

Production 
Holy Wound is produced by Sandeep. R under the banner Sahasrara Cinemas and Paul Wiclif is the writer, Unni Madavoor is the cinematographer, Vipin Mannoor is the editor and Marakkar fame Ronnie Raphael composed the music. The film was released as a direct OTT release on 12 August 2022.

References

External links 

2020s Malayalam-language films
Indian silent films
Indian LGBT-related films
Indian romance films